The 2007 Pan American Aerobic Gymnastics Championships were held in Morelos, Mexico. The competition was organized by the Mexican Gymnastics Federation.

Medalists

References

2007 in gymnastics
International gymnastics competitions hosted by Mexico
2007 in Mexican sports
Aerobic Gymnastics,2007